H12 may refer to:

Vehicles 
 Bell H-12, an American utility helicopter 
 Curtiss H-12, an American flying boat
 Hiller H-12, an American helicopter
 , a Royal Navy A-class destroyer
 , a Royal Navy H-class submarine
 LSWR H12 class, a British steam railcar

Other uses 
 H-12, Islamabad, site of a campus of the National University of Sciences & Technology
 Highway H12 (Ukraine)
 London Buses route H12, a Transport for London contracted bus route